is a Japanese manga series written and illustrated by Shūichi Asō. Following a series of one-shot chapters published from 2010 to 2011, the manga was serialized in Shueisha's Weekly Shōnen Jump from May 2012 to February 2018. It was followed by a short serialization of 4-panel chapters published in the same magazine, and two one-shot chapters published in Jump GIGA in May and July 2018. Shueisha collected its chapters in twenty-six tankōbon volumes.

An anime television series adaptation aired from July 2016 to December 2018. A live-action film directed by Yuichi Fukuda and starring Kento Yamazaki at Columbia Pictures (Sony Pictures Entertainment Japan) and Asmik Ace was released in October 2017. A six episode sequel anime series entitled The Disastrous Life of Saiki K.: Reawakened, premiered on Netflix in December 2019.

Premise

Kusuo Saiki is one of the high school students who was born having various psychic powers, including psychokinesis and teleportation. He attempts to hide it from everyone at school. He is put in several seemingly normal scenarios in which he uses it to hide his special powers.

Media

Manga

The Disastrous Life of Saiki K. is written and illustrated by Shūichi Asō. He started publishing one-shot chapters of the series. The first chapter was published in the Summer 2010 issue of Jump Next! on August 16, 2010. Chapters were then irregularly published in Weekly Shōnen Jump from May 9 to November 21, 2011, and in the Winter 2012 issue of Jump Next! on December 26, 2011. A compiled tankōbon volume was published on May 2, 2012. The series was then serialized in Weekly Shōnen Jump from May 14, 2012, to February 26, 2018. It was later followed by a short serialization of 4-panel chapters published in the same magazine. Asō published one-shot chapters in Shueisha's Jump GIGA on May 25 and July 26, 2018. Shueisha has compiled its 281 individual chapters into twenty-six individual tankōbon volumes, published from September 4, 2012, to August 3, 2018.

Light novel
On May 4, 2013, a light novel titled, Saiki Kusuo no Psi-nan - Extra Story of Psychics was released, following with Saiki Kusuo no Psi-nan - Extra Story of Psychics 2 in July 2014.

Anime

A flash anime series based on the manga began release on Jump Live from August 4, 2013, featuring the same voice cast as an earlier Comic adaptation.

An anime television adaptation was announced by Weekly Shōnen Jump in 2016. J.C.Staff and Egg Firm produced the adaptation, with Hiroaki Sakurai directing, Michiko Yokote handling series composition and Masayuki Onji designing the characters. The series began airing on July 4, 2016, on TV Tokyo, with an episode airing every weekday morning followed by a compilation episode at the end of each week, the series would contain one hundred and twenty episodes in total, along with twenty four compilation episodes on Oha Suta. The series was simulcast by Funimation, who released an English dub on August 7, 2016.

A 24-episode second season aired from January to June 2018. In the last episode of the second season, an anime conclusion special was announced. It premiered on December 28, 2018.

On March 24, 2019, it was announced that a new anime series would be released on Netflix, with the cast and staff returning to reprise their roles. Titled The Disastrous Life of Saiki K. Starting Arc or The Disastrous Life of Saiki K. Reawakened, the 6-episode new series premiered on December 30, 2019, on Netflix worldwide. While the new anime series is not a full-length season, Netflix officially lists the reboot as the fourth season on their streaming platform, while the conclusion special was listed as the third season.

Video games
A video game titled Saiki Kusuo no Psi Nan: Shijō Psi Dai no Psi Nan!? was announced in the Weekly Shōnen Jump magazine's 32nd issue of 2016. The game was developed by Bandai Namco Studios and published by Bandai Namco Entertainment for Nintendo 3DS. It was released on November 10, 2016, in Japan.

Another video game adaptation, 斉木楠雄のΨ難 妄想暴走！Ψキックバトル, is a tower defense game for mobile phones announced at Jump Festa 2018. It was released on April 16, 2018, in Japan.

Kusuo also appears as a playable character in the Jump crossover fighting game J-Stars Victory VS released in 2014. Its European and North American release marks the first release of Saiki Kusuo no Psi-nan material outside Japan.

Live-action film

Notes

References

External links
 

2016 anime television series debuts
2018 anime television series debuts
Anime series based on manga
Bandai Namco games
Comedy anime and manga
Fiction about psychic powers
Funimation
J.C.Staff
Japan-exclusive video games
Japanese high school television series
Mobile games
Netflix original anime
Nintendo 3DS games
Nintendo 3DS-only games
Shōnen manga
Shueisha franchises
Shueisha manga
Supernatural anime and manga
TV Tokyo original programming
Video games based on anime and manga
Video games developed in Japan
Yonkoma